Great Activity is the sixth studio album from J-pop star and Japanese voice actor Nana Mizuki.

Track listing
Bring it on!
Lyrics: Nana Mizuki
Composition: Matsuki Fuji
Arrangement: Elements Garden
Orchestral Fantasia
Lyrics: Hibiki
Composition, arrangement: Elements Garden
November theme for Music Fighter
Promise on Christmas
Lyrics: Sutsuka Hiwatari
Composition, arrangement: Hayato Tanaka
MASSIVE WONDERS
Lyrics: Nana Mizuki
Composition, arrangement: Toshiro Yabuki
Ending theme for Nippon TV variety program in August
Second opening song for anime television series Magical Girl Lyrical Nanoha Strikers
Take a chance
Lyrics: Chisato Nishimura
Composition: Wakabayashi Takashi
Arrangement: Shinya Saito

Lyrics: Yuumao
Composition, arrangement: Junpei Fujita (Elements Garden)

Lyrics, composition: Hajime Mizoshita
Arrangement: Tsutomu Ohira
SEVEN
Lyrics, composition: Nana Mizuki
Arrangement: Hitoshi Fujima (Elements Garden)

Lyrics: Bee'
Composition, arrangement: AGENT-MR
TRY AGAIN
Lyrics, composition, arrangement: Toshiro Yabuki
Secret Ambition
Lyrics: Nana Mizuki
Composition: Shikura Chiyomaru
Arrangement: Hitoshi Fujima (Elements Garden)
Opening song for anime television series Magical Girl Lyrical Nanoha Strikers
Nostalgia
Lyrics: SAYURI
Composition: TLAST
Arrangement: Shinya Saito
Heart-shaped chant
Lyrics: Nana Mizuki
Composition, arrangement: Noriyasu Agematsu (Elements Garden)
Theme song for PS2 game Shining Wind
Chronicle of sky
Lyrics, composition: Shikura Chiyomaru
Arrangement: Elements Garden
Sing Forever
Lyrics: Sonoda Ryoji
Composition, arrangement: Hitoshi Fujima (Elements Garden)

DVD
NANA SUMMER FESTA 2007 DIGEST:
OPENING: Level Hi!
10. You have a dream
NANA SONG BEST 50-41
09. 
08. New Sensation
07. SUPER GENERATION
NANA SONG BEST 40-31
06. Tears' Night
05. Heart-shaped chant
04. Crystal Letter
03. Eternal Blaze
NANA SONG BEST 30-21
02. POWER GATE
NANA SONG BEST 20-11
01. innocent starter
 ~acoustic version~
 ~acoustic version~
Massive Wonders

Charts

External links
Information on official website

2007 albums
Nana Mizuki albums